Dobrzelin  is a village in the administrative district of Gmina Żychlin, within Kutno County, Łódź Voivodeship, in central Poland.

The village has a population of 1,400.

References

Dobrzelin